was a Japanese screenwriter for both film and television.

Career
Born in the village of Kitahata in Saga Prefecture, Ide graduated from the Tokyo Higher School of Arts (now the Faculty of Engineering of Chiba University). He initially worked as a magazine illustrator and advertising designer, but through an introduction from the producer Sanezumi Fujimoto, he joined the Toho Studios, first working as a theater manager. After serving during World War II, he rejoined Toho and debuted as a screenwriter in 1949 with Aoi sanmyaku, which was a major hit. He turned freelance in 1951, and penned scripts for directors such as Mikio Naruse, Yuzo Kawashima, and Kihachi Okamoto. He was known for his adaptations of literary works. He also wrote scripts for television.

Selected filmography
Aoi sanmyaku (1949)
Repast (1951)
Mōjū Tsukai no Shōjo (1952)
Adolescence Part II (1953)
An Inlet of Muddy Water (1953)
Wife (1953)
Husband and Wife (1953)
Onna no Koyomi (1954)
A Wife's Heart (1956)
Romantic Daughters (1956)
Nagareru (1956)
Suzaki Paradise: Akashingō (1956)
On Wings of Love (1957)
Daughters, Wives and a Mother (1960)
A Wanderer's Notebook (1962)
The Elegant Life of Mr. Everyman (1963)
The Stranger Within a Woman (1966)

References

External links 

1910 births
1988 deaths
People from Saga Prefecture
Chiba University alumni
20th-century Japanese screenwriters